= Stanley Froehner =

Physiologist and biophysicist

Stanley C. Froehner is an American physiologist and biophysicist currently the UW Medicine Distinguished Professor at University of Washington and an Elected Fellow of the American Association for the Advancement of Science.

== Education ==
He earned his Ph.D. at California Institute of Technology.

== Research ==
His interests are muscle biology and disease. His highest cited paper is Interaction of nitric oxide synthase with the postsynaptic density protein PSD-95 and α1-syntrophin mediated by PDZ domains, at 1662 times according to Google Scholar.

== Publications ==
- An α-syntrophin-dependent pool of AQP4 in astroglial end-feet confers bidirectional water flow between blood and brain. vol. 100 no. 4. Mahmood Amiry-Moghaddam, 2106–2111, doi: 10.1073/pnas.0437946100. 2003.
- Syntrophin-dependent expression and localization of Aquaporin-4 water channel protein. vol. 98 no. 24. John D. Neely, 14108–14113, doi: 10.1073/pnas.241508198. 2001.
- Interaction of muscle and brain sodium channels with multiple members of the syntrophin family of dystrophin-associated proteins. Stephen H. Gee, Raghavan Madhavan, S. Rock Levinson, John H. Caldwell, Robert Sealock and Stanley C. Froehner. Journal of Neuroscience 1 January 1998, 18 (1) 128–137
- Delayed K+ clearance associated with aquaporin-4 mislocalization: Phenotypic defects in brains of α-syntrophin-null mice. vol. 100 no. 23. Mahmood Amiry-Moghaddam, 13615–13620, doi: 10.1073/pnas.2336064100. 2003.
